Screwballs II, also known as Loose Screws, is a 1985 Canadian teen sex comedy film. It is a sequel to Screwballs and was one of the first releases from Roger Corman's Concorde Pictures.

Synopsis
Brad Lovett, Steve Hardman, Hugh G. Rection, and Marvin Eatmore are four get-nowhere boys who are forced into summer school, ending up at Cockswell Academy under the supervision of Principal Arsenault.  The boys play a game where they earn points for every girl with whom they score. On misadventures of their own, they decide to go for the ultimate 100-point score, Mona Lott, the new French teacher, but when they are unable to get a shot at her, they end up in the unforgiving clutches of the principal. After all is lost, they take one final chance during the school's anniversary celebration.

Cast
 Bryan Genesse	as Brad Lovett
 Lance Van Der Kolk as Steve Hardman
 Alan Deveau as Hugh G. Rection
 Jason Warren as Marvin Eatmore
 Annie McAuley	as Nikki Nystroke
 Karen Wood as Gail Poulet
 Liz Green	as Tracey Gratehead
 Mike MacDonald	as Mr. Arsenault
 Cynthia Belliveau	as Mona Lott (as Cyd Belliveau)
 Deborah Lobban as Hilda Von Blow
 Carolyn Tweedle as Female Teacher
 Stephanie Sulik as Claudia Arsenault
 Terrea Smith as Wendy the Waitress (as Terrea Oster)
 Wayne Fleming	as Pigpen M.C.
 Lisa Maggiore as Student

Reception
The Los Angeles Times said the film was "the formula in excelsis. The only real difference is that it's been pushed further than usual, one of the hallmarks of Roger Corman, whose Concorde Pictures released it (you expect more from Corman). The movie is single-mindedly prurient, and scenarist Michael Cory has come up with the lewdest language this side of Hustler. Almost every line in the movie is either unprintable or a double entendre".

Soundtrack
The soundtrack was handled by Fred Mollin; it includes songs by The Nu Kats:
 "Changing" (Demi Moore - Freddy Moore) - The Nu Kats
 "Circular Impressions" - (Denis Keldie - L. Stevenson) - The Extras
 "Summer Fun" - (Bill King) - Bill King Quartet
 "Jump For Joy" - (Tim Ryan - Jonathan Goldsmith - Kerry Crawford) - Tim Ryan
 "Dance The Screw" - (Errol Francis - Susan Francis) - Errol Francis and the Francis Factor
 "Dance Tonight" - (Errol Francis) - Errol Francis and the Francis Factor
 "Do The Screw" - (Fred Mollin) - Meyer and Kronke
 "School Break" - (Errol Francis - Susan Francis - Mark Francis) - Errol Francis and the Francis Factor
 "Screw It" - (Denis Keldie - L. Stevenson) - Denis Keldie

References

External links
 
 

1985 films
Canadian teen comedy films
1980s sex comedy films
1980s teen comedy films
1980s exploitation films
1980s high school films
Teen sex comedy films
Canadian sex comedy films
English-language Canadian films
Films scored by Fred Mollin
Films directed by Rafal Zielinski
Canadian sequel films
Canadian independent films
1980s English-language films
1985 comedy films
1980s Canadian films